Sansan Fauzi Husaeni (born 1 August 1989) is an Indonesian professional footballer who plays as a striker for Liga 2 club Persipura Jayapura.

Club career

TIRA-Persikabo
In 2017, Sansan signed a year contract with TIRA-Persikabo. He made his debut on 27 May 2017 in a match against Persela Lamongan in the Liga 1. On 27 May 2017, Sansan scored his first goal for PS TNI against Persela Lamongan in the 53rd minute at the Pakansari Stadium, Bogor.

Persis Solo
He was signed for Persis Solo to play in Liga 2 in the 2020 season. This season was suspended on 27 March 2020 due to the COVID-19 pandemic. The season was abandoned and was declared void on 20 January 2021.

Madura United
In 2021, Sansan signed a contract with Indonesian Liga 1 club Madura United. He made his debut on 16 October 2021 in a match against Persela Lamongan at the Maguwoharjo Stadium, Sleman.

RANS Cilegon
He was signed for RANS Cilegon to play in the second round of Liga 2 in the 2021 season. Sansan made his debut on 15 December 2021 in a match against Persis Solo at the Pakansari Stadium, Cibinong.

Honours

Club
RANS Cilegon
 Liga 2 runner-up: 2021

References

External links
 Sansan Husaeni at Soccerway
 Sansan Husaeni at Liga Indonesia

Indonesian footballers
1989 births
Indonesian Muslims
People from Tasikmalaya
Association football forwards
Living people
Indonesian Premier Division players
Indonesian Premier League players
Liga 1 (Indonesia) players
Liga 2 (Indonesia) players
Persija Jakarta (IPL) players
Persija Jakarta players
Persikad Depok players
Persikabo 1973 players
Persis Solo players
Madura United F.C. players
RANS Nusantara F.C. players
Persipura Jayapura players
Sportspeople from West Java